Carmine Michael Infantino (May 24, 1925 – April 4, 2013) was an American comics artist and editor, primarily for DC Comics, during the late 1950s and early 1960s period known as the Silver Age of Comic Books. Among his character creations are the Black Canary and the Silver Age version of DC superhero the Flash with writer Robert Kanigher, the stretching Elongated Man with John Broome, Barbara Gordon the second Batgirl with writer Gardner Fox, Deadman with writer Arnold Drake, and Christopher Chance, the second iteration of the Human Target with Len Wein.

He was inducted into comics' Will Eisner Award Hall of Fame in 2000.

Early life
Carmine Infantino was born via midwife in his family's apartment in Brooklyn, New York City. His father, Pasquale "Patrick" Infantino, born in New York City, was originally a musician who played saxophone, clarinet, and violin, and had a band with composer Harry Warren. During the Great Depression he turned to a career as a licensed plumber. Carmine Infantino's mother, Angela Rosa DellaBadia, emigrated from Calitri, a hill town northeast of Naples, Italy.

Infantino attended Public Schools 75 and 85 in Brooklyn before going on to the School of Industrial Art (later renamed the High School of Art and Design) in Manhattan.  During his freshman year of high school, Infantino began working for Harry "A" Chesler, whose studio was one of a handful of comic-book "packagers" who created complete comics for publishers looking to enter the emerging field in the 1930s–1940s Golden Age of Comic Books. As Infantino recalled:

Career
With Frank Giacoia penciling, Infantino inked the feature "Jack Frost" in USA Comics #3 (cover-dated Jan. 1942), from Timely Comics, the forerunner of Marvel Comics. He wrote in his autobiography that

Infantino would eventually work for several publishers during the decade, drawing Human Torch and Angel stories for Timely; Airboy and Heap stories for Hillman Periodicals; working for packager Jack Binder, who supplied Fawcett Comics; briefly at Holyoke Publishing; then landing at DC Comics. Infantino's first published work for DC was "The Black Canary", a six-page Johnny Thunder story in Flash Comics #86 (Aug. 1947) that introduced the superheroine the Black Canary. Infantino's long association with the Flash mythos began with "The Secret City" a story in All-Flash #31 (Oct.–Nov. 1947). He additionally became a regular artist of the Golden Age Green Lantern and the Justice Society of America.

During the 1950s, Infantino freelanced for Joe Simon and Jack Kirby's company, Prize Comics, drawing the series Charlie Chan. Back at DC, during a lull in the popularity of superheroes, Infantino drew Westerns, mysteries, science fiction comics.

The Silver Age
In 1956, DC editor Julius Schwartz assigned writer Robert Kanigher and artist Infantino to the company's first attempt at reviving superheroes: an updated version of the Flash that would appear in issue #4 (Oct. 1956) of the try-out series Showcase. Infantino designed the now-classic red uniform with yellow detail (reminiscent of the original Fawcett Captain Marvel), striving to keep the costume as streamlined as possible, and he drew on his design abilities to create a new visual language to depict the Flash's speed, using both vertical and horizontal motion lines to make the figure a red and yellow blur. The eventual success of the new, science-fiction-oriented Flash heralded the wholesale return of superheroes, and the beginning of what fans and historians call the Silver Age of comics.

Infantino drew "Flash of Two Worlds," a landmark story published in The Flash #123 (Sept. 1961) that introduced Earth-Two, and more generally the concept of the multiverse, to DC Comics. Infantino continued to work for Schwartz in his other features and titles, most notably "Adam Strange" in Mystery in Space, succeeding the character's initial artist, Mike Sekowsky.  In 1964, Schwartz was made responsible for reviving the faded Batman titles. Writer John Broome and artist Infantino jettisoned the sillier aspects that had crept into the series (such as Ace the Bathound, and Bat-Mite) and gave the "New Look" Batman and Robin a more detective-oriented direction and sleeker draftsmanship that proved a hit combination.

Other features and characters Infantino drew at DC include "The Space Museum", and Elongated Man. With Gardner Fox, Infantino co-created the Blockbuster in Detective Comics #345 (Nov. 1965) and Barbara Gordon as a new version of Batgirl in Detective Comics #359 (Jan. 1967). Writer Arnold Drake and Infantino created the supernatural superhero Deadman in Strange Adventures #205 (Oct. 1967). This story included the first known depiction of narcotics in a story approved by the Comics Code Authority.

DC Comics editorial director
In late 1966/early 1967, Infantino was tasked by Irwin Donenfeld with designing covers for the entire DC line. Stan Lee learned this and approached Infantino with a $22,000 offer to move to Marvel. Publisher Jack Liebowitz confirmed that DC could not match the offer, but could promote Infantino to the position of art director. Initially reluctant, Infantino accepted what Liebowitz posed as a challenge, and stayed with DC. When DC was sold to Kinney National Company, Infantino was promoted to editorial director. He started by hiring new talent, and promoting artists to editorial positions. He hired Dick Giordano away from Charlton Comics, and made artists Joe Orlando, Joe Kubert and Mike Sekowsky editors. New talents such as artist Neal Adams and writer Denny O'Neil were brought into the company. Several of DC's older characters were revamped by O'Neil including Wonder Woman; Batman; Green Lantern and Green Arrow; and Superman.

In 1970, Infantino signed on Marvel Comics' star artist and storytelling collaborator Jack Kirby to a DC Comics contract. Beginning with Superman's Pal Jimmy Olsen, Kirby created his Fourth World saga that wove through that existing title and three new series he created. After the "Fourth World" titles were canceled, Kirby created several other series for DC including OMAC, Kamandi, The Demon, and, together with former partner Joe Simon for one last time, a new incarnation of the Sandman before returning to freelancing for Marvel in 1975.

DC Comics publisher
Infantino was made DC's publisher in early 1971, during a time of declining circulation for the company's comics, and he attempted a number of changes.  In an effort to increase revenue, he raised the cover price of DC's comics from 15 to 25 cents, simultaneously raising the page-count by adding reprints and new backup features. Marvel met the price increase, then dropped back to 20 cents; DC stayed at 25 cents for about a year, a decision that ultimately proved bad for overall sales.

Infantino and writer Len Wein co-created the "Human Target" feature in Action Comics #419 (December 1972). The character was adapted into a short-lived ABC television series starring Rick Springfield which debuted in July 1992.

After consulting with screenwriter Mario Puzo on the plots of both Superman: The Movie and Superman II, Infantino collaborated with Marvel on the historic company-crossover publication Superman vs. the Amazing Spider-Man. In January 1976, Warner Communications replaced Infantino with magazine publisher Jenette Kahn, a person new to the comics field. Infantino returned to drawing freelance.

Later career

Infantino later drew for a number of titles for Warren Publishing and Marvel, including the latter's Star Wars, Spider-Woman, and Nova. His brief collaboration with Jim Shooter saw the introduction of Paladin in Daredevil #150 (Jan. 1978). During Infantino's tenure on the Star Wars series, it was one of the industry's top selling titles. In 1981, he returned to DC Comics and co-created a revival of the "Dial H for Hero" feature with writer Marv Wolfman in a special insert in Legion of Super-Heroes #272 (February 1981). He and writer Cary Bates crafted a Batman backup story for Detective Comics #500 (March 1981). Infantino returned to The Flash title with issue #296 (April 1981) and drew the series until its cancellation with issue #350 (October 1985). He drew The Flash #300 (Aug. 1981), which was in the Dollar Comics format, and was one of the artists on the double-sized Justice League of America #200 (March 1982), his chapter featuring both the Flash and the Elongated Man, characters he had co-created.

He was one of the contributors to the DC Challenge limited series in 1986. Other projects in the 1980s included penciling The Daring New Adventures of Supergirl, a Red Tornado miniseries, and a comic book tie-in to the television series V. In 1990, he followed Marshall Rogers as artist of the Batman newspaper comic strip and drew the strip until its cancellation the following year. During the 1990s Infantino also taught at the School of Visual Arts before retiring. Despite his retirement, Infantino made appearances at comic conventions in the early 21st century.

In 2004, he sued DC for rights to characters he alleged he had created while he was a freelancer for the company. These included several Flash characters including Wally West, Iris West, Captain Cold, Captain Boomerang, Mirror Master, and Gorilla Grodd, as well as the Elongated Man and Batgirl. The lawsuit was dismissed in September of that same year.

One of his final stories for the company appeared in DC Comics Presents: Batman #1 (Sept. 2004), a tribute to the then-recently deceased Julius Schwartz.

Artist Nick Cardy commented on the popular but apocryphal anecdote, told by Julius Schwartz, about Infantino firing Cardy over not following a cover layout, only to rehire him moments later when Schwartz praised the errant cover art:

Infantino wrote or contributed to two books about his life and career: The Amazing World of Carmine Infantino (Vanguard Productions), and Carmine Infantino: Penciler, Publisher, Provocateur (Tomorrows Publishing).

Death
Infantino died on April 4, 2013, at the age of 87 at his home in Manhattan.

Legacy
In season three of The CW TV show "The Flash", episode 22 is titled "Infantino Street".

Awards
Infantino's awards include:

 1958 National Cartoonists Society Award, Best Comic Book
 1961 Alley Award, Best Single Issue: The Flash #123 (with Gardner Fox)
 1961 Alley Award, Best Story: "Flash of Two Worlds", The Flash #123 (with Gardner Fox)
 1961 Alley Award, Best Artist
 1962 Alley Award, Best Book-Length Story: "The Planet that Came to a Standstill!", Mystery in Space #75 (with Gardner Fox)
 1962 Alley Award, Best Pencil Artist
 1963 Alley Award, Best Artist
 1964 Alley Award, Best Short Story: "Doorway to the Unknown", The Flash #148 (with John Broome)
 1964 Alley Award, Best Pencil Artist
 1964 Alley Award, Best Comic Book Cover (Detective Comics #329 with Murphy Anderson)
 1967 Alley Award, Best Full-Length Story: "Who's Been Lying in My Grave?", Strange Adventures #205 (with Arnold Drake)
 1967 Alley Award, Best New Strip: "Deadman" in Strange Adventures (with Arnold Drake)
 1969 special Alley Award for being the person "who exemplifies the spirit of innovation and inventiveness in the field of comic art"
 1985: Named as one of the honorees by DC Comics in the company's 50th anniversary publication Fifty Who Made DC Great.
 2000: Inkpot Award

Bibliography

DC Comics

Action Comics (Human Target) #419 (1972); (Superman, Nightwing, Green Lantern, Deadman) #642 (1989)
Adventure Comics (Black Canary) #399 (1970); (Dial H for Hero) #479–485, 487–490 (1981–1982)
Adventures of Rex, the Wonder Dog (Detective Chimp) #1–4, 6, 13, 15–46 (1952–1959)
Batman 208, 234–235, 255, 261–262 (1969–1975)
Best of DC (Teen Titans) #18 (1981)
The Brave and the Bold #67, 72, 172, 183, 190, 194 (1966–1983)
Danger Trail (miniseries) #1–4 (1993)
DC Challenge #3 (1986)
DC Comics Presents (Superman and the Flash) #73 (1984)
DC Comics Presents: Batman (Julius Schwartz tribute issue) (2004)
Detective Comics (Boy Commandos): #144–148; (Batman): #327, 329, 331, 333, 335, 337, 339, 341, 343, 345, 347, 349, 351, 353, 355, 357, 359, 361, 363, 366–367, 369; (Elongated Man): #327–330, 332–342, 344–358, 362–363, 366–367, 500 (1964–1967, 1981)
The Flash #105–174 (1959–1967), #296–350 (1981–1985)
Green Lantern, vol. 2, #53 (1967); (Adam Strange): #137, 145–147; (Green Lantern Corps) #151–153 (1981–1982)
House of Mystery #294, 296 (1981)
Justice League of America #200, 206 (1982)
Legion of Super-Heroes (Dial "H" for Hero preview) #272; (backup story) #289 (1981–1982)
Mystery in Space (Adam Strange) #53–84 (1959–1963); #117 (1981)
Phantom Stranger #1–3, 5–6 (1952–1953)
Red Tornado, miniseries, #1–4 (1985)
Secret Origins (Adam Strange) #17–19; (Gorilla Grodd) #40; (Space Museum) #50; (The Flash) Annual #2 (1987–1990)
Showcase (Flash) #4, 8, 13–14 (1956–1958)
Strange Adventures (Deadman) #205 (1967)
Supergirl, vol. 2, #1–20, 22–23 (1982–1984)
Superman (Supergirl) #376; (Superman) #404 (1982–1985)
Superman meets the Quik Bunny (1987)
Super Powers, miniseries, #1–4 (1986)
Teen Titans #27, 30 (1970)
Tales of the Teen Titans #49 (1984)
V #1–3, 6–16 (1985–1986)
World's Finest Comics (Hawkman) #276, 282 (1982)

Marvel Comics

Avengers #178, 197, 203, 244 (1978–1984)
Captain America #245 (1980)
Daredevil #149–150, 152 (1977–1978)
The Deep #1 (A Marvel Movie Special) (1977)
Defenders #55–56 (1978)
Ghost Rider #43–44 (1980)
Howard the Duck #21, 28 (1978)
The Incredible Hulk #244 (1980)
Iron Man #108–109, 122, 158 (1978–1982)
Marvel Fanfare (Doctor Strange) #8; (Shanna, the She-Devil) #56 (1991)
Marvel Preview (Star-Lord) #14–15 (1978)
Marvel Team-Up #92–93, 97, 105 (1980–1981)
Ms. Marvel #14, 19 (1978)
Nova #15–20, 22–25 (1977–1979)
Savage Sword of Conan #34 (1978)
Spider-Woman #1–19 (1978–1979)
Star Wars #11–15, 18–37, 45–48, Annual #2 (full art); #53–54 (with Walt Simonson) (1978–1982)
Super-Villain Team-Up #16 (May 1979)
What If (Nova) #15; (Ghost Rider, Spider-Woman, Captain Marvel) #17 (1979)

Warren Publishing
Creepy #83–90, 93, 98 (1976–1978)
Eerie #77, 79–84 (1976–1977)
Vampirella (backup stories) #57–60 (1977)

References

External links

 CarmineInfantino.com (fan site). WebCitation archive.
 
 
 Carmine Infantino at Mike's Amazing World of Comics
 Carmine Infantino at the Unofficial Handbook of Marvel Comics Creators

1925 births
2013 deaths
20th-century American artists
American comics artists
American people of Italian descent
American publishers (people)
Art Students League of New York alumni
Comic book editors
Comic book publishers (people)
Golden Age comics creators
High School of Art and Design alumni
Inkpot Award winners
Artists from Brooklyn
School of Visual Arts faculty
Silver Age comics creators
Will Eisner Award Hall of Fame inductees
DC Comics people